Anatoly Aleksandrovich Sobchak (10 August 1937 – 19 February 2000) was a Soviet and Russian politician, a co-author of the Constitution of the Russian Federation, the first democratically elected mayor of Saint Petersburg, and a mentor and teacher of future presidents Vladimir Putin and Dmitry Medvedev.

Biography

Soviet legal scholar
Anatoly Sobchak was born in Chita, Russian SFSR, Soviet Union, on 10 August 1937. His father, Aleksander Antonovich, was a railroad engineer of Polish and Czech origin, and his mother, Nadezhda Andreyevna Litvinova, was an accountant of Russian and Ukrainian origin. Anatoly was one of four brothers. In 1939, the family moved to Uzbekistan, where Anatoly lived until 1953 before entering Stavropol Law College. In 1954, he transferred to Leningrad State University. In 1958, he married Nonna Gandzyuk, a student of Hertzen Teacher's College. They had a daughter called Maria Sobchak, born in 1965, who is currently a St Petersburg lawyer while her son Gleb Sobchak, born in 1983, graduated from the Law Faculty of St. Petersburg State University.

After graduating from Leningrad State University, he worked for three years as a lawyer in Stavropol, then returned to Leningrad State University for graduate studies (1962–1965). After obtaining his Ph.D., he taught law at the Leningrad Police School and the Leningrad Institute for Cellulose and Paper Industries' Technology (1965–1973), and between 1973 and 1990 he taught at Leningrad State University. In 1980, he married Lyudmila Narusova, at that time a history student at the Leningrad Academy of Soviet Culture and later a prominent MP. They had a daughter, Ksenia Sobchak.

After obtaining his D.Sc. in 1982, he was appointed Professor and Head of the Department of Common Law in Socialist Economics. He was very popular among law students, especially for his mildly anti-government comments. During his work at Leningrad State University, he established close relations with its then administrator of international affairs, Vladimir Putin, which he maintained for the rest of his life.

Legislator
In 1989, after election laws changed during Perestroika, he was elected as an independent candidate to the Congress of People's Deputies of the Soviet Union. He was one of only a few deputies who had a legal background, so he contributed enormously to most of the laws created from 1989 to 1991. He became one of the founders and a co-chairman of the Inter-Regional Deputies Group along with Andrei Sakharov and Boris Yeltsin. He also was a chairman of the Parliamentary Commission on the Investigation of the events of 9 April 1989 in Tbilisi. The Commission condemned the military, which was blamed for many deaths when dispersing demonstrators. The Commission's report made it more difficult to use military force against civil demonstrations in the Soviet Union and Russia.

He was a member of the President's Consultative Council during Mikhail Gorbachev's tenure and contributed to legislation that originated from the presidential administration.

After the Soviet Union was dissolved in 1991, Sobchak was not a member of the central Parliament but was a member of Yeltsin's Presidential Council and the chairman of the Constitutional Assembly that prepared the Constitution of the Russian Federation in 1993. The constitution is often informally called Sobchak's constitution, although its real authors have been somewhat less known.

Mayor of Saint Petersburg
In April 1990, Sobchak was elected a deputy of the Leningrad City Council, and in May he became the chairman of the Council. From the beginning, his leadership was marked by a strongly authoritarian bent.  The Council decided to change the structure of the city governance so as to have a Mayor elected by direct elections. The first of such elections in June 1991 were combined with the referendum on the city name. Sobchak won the elections, and the city voted to return to its historical name of Saint Petersburg. The name change was established in one of the last sessions of the Congress of People's Deputies of the Soviet Union, held on 12 September 1991. The change needed an amendment of the Constitution of the Soviet Union and its passage required much effort by Sobchak.

During his tenure, a Kissinger-Sobchak commission was formed in order to attract western investment into St. Petersburg. According to Putin who had met with Kissinger a couple of times, when Kissinger stated that the Soviet Union had pulled out of Eastern Europe too quickly under Gorbachev and that Kissinger was being blamed but Kissinger had thought it was impossible, Putin had agreed with Kissinger because so many problems would have been avoided if the pullout had not been so hasty.

Sobchak was Mayor of Saint Petersburg from 1991 to 1996. During his tenure, the city became a place of glamorous cultural and sporting events. Most of the everyday control of the city structure was handled by two Mayor's deputies – Vladimir Yakovlev and Vladimir Putin; critics alleged deterioration of city infrastructure, growing corruption, and crime during this time.
In the 1996 mayoral election, Sobchak was opposed by his former first deputy Vladimir Yakovlev and lost by a margin of 1.2%. The major pitch of Yakovlev's campaign was that Sobchak's patronage of the arts (with city money) and involvement in federal politics prevented him from solving the real problems of the city.

After falling out with Sobchak, Yury Shutov wrote the book Heart of a Dog as a criticism of Sobchak in 1991.

Emigration and return 
In 1997, a criminal investigation started against Sobchak. He was accused of irregularities in the privatization of his own apartment, his elder daughter's apartment, and his wife's art studio. By the standards of the 1990s in Russia, the allegations were relatively minor (although the alleged losses for city finances were still in the tens of thousands of dollars). Thus, Sobchak's supporters saw the criminal proceedings as a political repression. According to Ksenia Sobchak, this campaign was started in 1995 from Moscow to prevent her father from running in future presidential elections.

On 7 November 1997, Sobchak flew to Paris on a private plane without passport processing on the Russian side. The formal reason for his departure was medical treatment in a Paris hospital for his heart condition, but Sobchak never checked in at the hospital. Between 1997 and 1999, he lived the typical life of a political émigré in Paris.

In June 1999, his friend Vladimir Putin became much stronger politically (in a few weeks he became the Prime Minister of Russia), and he was able to make the prosecutors drop the charges against Sobchak. On 12 June 1999, Sobchak returned to Russia. After his return, Sobchak became a very active supporter of Putin in his quest for the Russian presidency.

Death

On 17 February 2000, Putin met with Sobchak and urged him to travel to Kaliningrad to support his election campaign. Sobchak traveled there, accompanied by two assistants who also served as his bodyguards. On 20 February 2000, Sobchak died suddenly in the town of Svetlogorsk of the Kaliningrad Oblast. The initial suspected cause of death was a heart attack, but the findings of two medical experts were contradictory. A criminal investigation of Sobchak's death as a possible "premeditated murder with aggravating circumstances" was opened only on 6 May 2000, more than two months later. After three months, the investigation was closed without a finding. The Democratic Union party led by Valeria Novodvorskaya made an official statement that not only Sobchak, but also two of his aides had heart attacks simultaneously, which indicated poisoning. Two other men were present with Sobchak during his death, but their names were not publicly disclosed.

According to an independent investigation by Arkady Vaksberg, both bodyguards of Sobchak were treated for symptoms of poisoning after Sobchak's death, indicating a probable contract killing by poisoning. Sobchak's widow Lyudmila had her own autopsy done on her husband's body, but never made the results public; she told the BBC that she keeps the findings in a secure location outside Russia.

He was interred in Nikolskoe Cemetery at the Alexander Nevsky Monastery in St. Petersburg, near the grave of Galina Starovoitova.

Honours and awards
 Jubilee Medal "300 Years of the Russian Navy" (1996)
 Order of Holy Prince Daniel of Moscow, 1st class
 Silver medal of the International Olympic Committee (1995)
 Honorary citizen of St. Petersburg (2010, posthumous), Tbilisi (Georgia, 1991), Indianapolis (USA, 1992), Maryland (USA, 1993), Oklahoma (USA, 1994), Georgia (1995)
 Honorary Doctor of Law at the University of South Florida St. Petersburg (1991), University of Macerata (Italy, 1992), St. Petersburg Law Institute of the Russian Interior Ministry
 Honorary Doctor of Political Science, University of Genoa (Italy, 1992)
 Honorary Doctor of the University of Arts in Oklahoma City (1993)
 Honorary Doctor of Humanities, Towson University (Baltimore, USA, 1993)
 Professor Emeritus of the University of Bordeaux (France), East European Institute of Psychoanalysis (St. Petersburg, Russia)
 Mitterrand awarded the Foundation "Memoria" (France, 1991)
 Prize winner of the National Democratic Institute of the A. Garrimana (USA, Washington, 1992)
 Prize winner J. Fulbright National Law Center at George Washington University (Washington, USA, 1992)
 International Leonardo Prize (1996)
 Prize winners Starovoitova (2000, posthumously)
 Tsarskoye Selo Art Prize (2001, posthumously)
 Winner of the International Prize for the development and strengthening of cultural ties in the Baltic Sea Region "Baltic Star" (2005, posthumously)
 Gold Medal of the city of Dubrovnik (Croatia, 1991)
 Gold Medal of the city of Florence (Italy, 1991)
 Full member of the St. Petersburg Academy of Engineering (Department of economic and legal sciences) (1992)
 Member of the International Informatization Academy (Moscow, 1995)
 Honorary member of the St. Petersburg Union of Engineering Societies (1992)
 Gagarin Medal (1996)
 Medal Admiral MP Lazarev (1996)
 "Gratitude" medal of the Nagorno-Karabakh Republic (2002, posthumously)
 Imperial Order of St. Alexander Nevsky (2002, posthumously)

See also
Saint Petersburg City Administration

Notes

References

External links

Official site of Anatoly Sobchak (Russian)
Boris Vishnevsky Anatoly Sobchak: Triumph and Tragedy (Russian)

1937 births
2000 deaths
People from Chita, Zabaykalsky Krai
Saint Petersburg State University alumni
Academic staff of Saint Petersburg State University
Academic staff of the University of Paris
Soviet jurists
Russian jurists
Russian legal scholars
Russian politicians
Recipients of the Order of Holy Prince Daniel of Moscow
Russian people of Czech descent
Russian people of Polish descent
Russian people of Ukrainian descent
Russian emigrants to France
Members of the Congress of People's Deputies of the Soviet Union
Resigned Communist Party of the Soviet Union members
Our Home – Russia politicians
Members of the Federation Council of Russia (1996–2000)
Russian monarchists
Governors of Saint Petersburg
Burials at Nikolskoe Cemetery